Barin Township, also spelled Baren, is a township of Akto County (Aketao), Kizilsu Kyrgyz Autonomous Prefecture (Kezilesu), Xinjiang Uygur Autonomous Region, China. The township is located on the western edge of the Taklamakan Desert at the foot of the Pamir Mountains. Located in the middle west of the northeastern part of the county, the township covers an area of 1,087 square kilometers with a population of 38,706 (as of 2017). It has 19 administrative villages under its jurisdiction. Its seat is at Barin Village .

Name

Barin Township is located between the Gez River (Gez Darya) to the west and the Kushan River (K'u-shan Ho) to the east. The word "Baihal" from the Arabic language refers generally to the area between two rivers. The pronunciation of this word gradually evolved into the Uyghur word "barin", which became the name of Barin Township. Barin is transliterated into Chinese characters as '', which is read in Mandarin Chinese as Baren (pinyin-derived) and Pa-jen (Wade-Giles derived). Barin was also called Balong during the Qing Dynasty.

History
In 1955, Barin, formerly part of Yengisar, became part of Akto County.

In 1962, Barin Commune was established.

In 1962, Barin Commune was renamed Xianfeng Commune ('vanguard/pioneer commune' ).

In 1984, Xianfeng Commune became Barin Township.

In April 1990, the Baren Township riot occurred in the township.

Geography
The township of Barin is located on the edge of the Taklamakan Desert and the Pamir Plateau, and is located between the Gez River and the Kushan River on the eastern slope of the Kunlun Range and the western edge of the Tarim Basin. It is located in the east longitude 75°27′- 75°52′, the north latitude 38°08′- 39°36′, the southwest of the county seat Akto Town. It is bordered by Pilal Township, Yumai Township, Oytak Township, Kezilto Township, Bulungkol Township, and Shufu County and Yingjisha County. Its maximum length is 24 km from west to east, 66 km north to south, with a total area of 1,087 square kilometers and an arable land area of 2,940 hectares. Its seat is 17 kilometers away from the county seat.

Administrative divisions

The township has 19 administration villages.

19 administration villages
 Arelmaili	(Aremailicun) 
 Barin	(Baren, Barencun) 
 Dunbag	(Dunbage, Dunbagecun) 
 Gulbag	(Gulbage, Gulbagecun) 
 Hanterek	(Hantiereke, Hantierekecun) 
 Jiayi	()
 Kizilbayilak	(Kezilebayilake)
 Kizilwustang	(Kezilewusitang, Kezile Wusitangcun) 
 Kumu	(Kumucun) 
 Kurgan	(Ku'ergan, Ku'ergancun) 
 Nurbag	(Nu'erbage)
 Qieke	(Qiekecun) 
 Qoghunchi	(Kuohongqi)
 Sayibag	(Sayibage, Sayibagecun, Sayi Bagecun) 
 Tur	(Tu'er)
 Xinghuayuan	()
 Yelgan	(Yelegan, Yelegancun) 
 Yingmaili	()
 Yitipak	(Yitipake)

 Unincorporated villages  
 Bekmahalla

Economy
Agricultural products of Barin include wheat, corn and cotton among others. Barin is known for its apricots and also grows sea buckthorn.

Baren apricot
Akto County was named as "Hometown of Baren Apricot of China"  by the Ministry of Agriculture in 2002 and by the National Forestry Administration in 2014. Baren apricot is one of the main fruits of local farmers planted, because of its highest yield and best quality in Barin and named after the place. Baren apricots are large, much flesh, high in sugar, sweet and delicious and of high yield, is a well-known local product of high-quality in Xinjiang. Barin Township is the core production area of Baren apricot, the local planting area of 933 hectares (14,000 mu) with 350,000 plants, the output reached 5,000 tons in 2018. The products through the e-commerce platform, were sold all over China.

Demographics

, the population of Barin Township was 96.9% Uyghur.

References 

Township-level divisions of Akto County